Baron Brassey of Apethorpe, of Apethorpe in the County of Northampton, is a title in the Peerage of the United Kingdom. It was created in 1938 for Sir Henry Brassey, 1st Baronet, who had previously represented Northamptonshire Northern and Peterborough in the House of Commons as a Conservative. He had already been created a Baronet, of Apethorpe in the County of Northampton, in 1922. Brassey was the second but eldest surviving son of Henry Brassey, third son of Thomas Brassey, and the nephew of Thomas Brassey, 1st Earl Brassey, and Albert Brassey.  the titles are held by his great-grandson, the fourth Baron, who succeeded his father in 2015.

The family seat is The Manor House, Apethorpe, Northamptonshire

Barons Brassey of Apethorpe (1938)

  Henry Leonard Campbell Brassey, 1st Baron Brassey of Apethorpe (1870–1958)
  Bernard Thomas Brassey, 2nd Baron Brassey of Apethorpe (1905–1967)
  David Henry Brassey, 3rd Baron Brassey of Apethorpe (1932–2015)
 Edward Brassey, 4th Baron Brassey of Apethorpe (b. 1964) (current)
  Hon. Christian Brassey,  heir apparent (b. 2003)

See also
Earl Brassey

References

Kidd, Charles, Williamson, David (editors). Debrett's Peerage and Baronetage (1990 edition). New York: St Martin's Press, 1990.

Baronies in the Peerage of the United Kingdom
Noble titles created in 1938
Noble titles created for UK MPs
Brassey family